Sofia Samoilova (1787 – 1854), was a Russian stage actress and opera singer (soprano).

She was engaged at the Bolshoi Theatre, Saint Petersburg in 1804-1843, during which she had a successful career and was regarded to belong to the elite of its members. She performed within opera, vaudeville as well as drama.

References

1787 births
19th-century actresses from the Russian Empire
Russian stage actresses
1854 deaths
19th-century opera singers from the Russian Empire